Peth Islampur is a village in the Sangli district of India, with a population of 11,238 as of 2011.

References

Villages in Sangli district